"Puttin' the Dark Back into the Night" is a song written by Mark Miller, and recorded by American country music group Sawyer Brown.  It was released in May 1990 as the third single from the album The Boys Are Back.  The song reached #33 on the Billboard Hot Country Singles & Tracks chart.

Chart performance

References

Songs about nights
1990 singles
Sawyer Brown songs
Songs written by Mark Miller (musician)
Capitol Records Nashville singles
Curb Records singles
1989 songs